The 16th Central Auditing Commission of the All-Union Communist Party (Bolsheviks) was elected by the 16th Congress, and was in session from 1930 until 1934.

Membership
 Aleksandr Brykov (1889–1937)
 Yakov Bykin (1889–1937)
 Mikhail Vladimirsky (1874–1951) — CAC Chairman.
 Nikolay Gikalo (1897–1938)
 Roman Davidson (1893–1937)
 Alfrēds Lepa (1896–1938)
 Ivan Pivovarov (1892–1937)
 Mikhail Razumov (1894–1937)
 Yevgeny Ryabinin (1892–1938)
 Aleksandr Ryabov (1888–1938)
 Sergey Stepanov (1876–1935)
 Ilya Shelekhes (1891–1938)
 Eduard Yurevich (1888–1958)

References

Central Auditing Commission of the Communist Party of the Soviet Union
1930 establishments in the Soviet Union
1934 disestablishments in the Soviet Union